Karina Urbach is a German historian with a special interest in the Nazi period (1933–45). She has written several books on 19th and 20th century European political and cultural history.

Urbach is currently researching American intelligence operations against the National Socialists in wartime and postwar.

Education and career 
Urbach was a Kurt Hahn Scholar at the University of Cambridge where she took her MPhil in International Relations (1992) and her PhD in history (1996). For her German Habilitation she was awarded the Bavarian Ministry of Culture prize. She taught at the University of Bayreuth, was a Research Fellow at the German Historical Institute London (2004-2009) and thereafter at the Institute of Historical Research, University of London.

Urbach is a board member of the Otto-von-Bismarck Foundation. In 2015 she became a long term visitor at the Institute for Advanced Study, Princeton, New Jersey.

In 2015 Urbach took part in uncovering a 1934 film clip of the British royal family making the fascist salute.< She has since then been campaigning with The Times and The Guardian for the release of Interwar period material from the royal archives. In 2020 she published Das Buch Alice (Alice's Book). The story of her grandmother Alice Urbach, a Jewish chef in Vienna whose bestselling cookbook was expropriated by the Nazis. Karina Urbach discovered that Alice was not the only Jewish author who had been replaced by an ‘Aryan’ stooge. Alice never saw her book published again under her name, but in 2020 the German magazine Der Spiegel ran a story about the findings of Alice's Book. As a consequence, Alice's publishing house issued a reprint. The English language version of Alice's Book appeared in May 2022, published by MacLehose Press and translated by Jamie Bulloch.

Urbach has worked as historical adviser on many BBC, PBS and German TV documentaries. She has contributed articles to the Wall Street Journal, The Guardian, The Literary Review, Die Zeit, Die Frankfurter Allgemeine (FAZ) and Die Tageszeitung (TAZ).

In 2017 Urbach published the historical novel Cambridge 5 under the pseudonym Hannah Coler. It was  shortlisted for the Friedrich Glauser prize and won the Crime Cologne Award in 2018.

Urbach is the daughter of the actress Wera Frydtberg.

Bibliography

Monographs 
Alice's Book: How the Nazis stole my grandmother's cookbook, London 2022,  
Das Buch Alice. Wie die Nazis das Kochbuch meiner Großmutter raubten, Berlin 2020,  
Go Betweens for Hitler, Oxford University Press, 2015 
 German translation: Hitlers heimliche Helfer, Darmstadt, 2016 
 Queen Victoria, A Biography, C.H. Beck, Munich 2011 (third edition 2014) 
 Bismarck's Favourite Englishman. Lord Odo Russell's Mission to Berlin, Tauris Academic Press, London and New York, 1999

Edited Books 
 with Ulrich Lappenküper (eds.), Realpolitik für Europa: Bismarcks Weg, Paderborn, 2016
 with Franz Bosbach, John Davis (eds.), Common Heritage, Documents and Sources concerning German-British Relations in the Archives and Collections of Windsor and Coburg, Vol. I, 2015 , Vol. II, 2017 
 with Jonathan Haslam (eds.), Secret Intelligence and the International Relations of Europe in the 20thC, Stanford University Press, 2013
 with Brendan Simms (eds.), Bringing Personality back in: Leadership and War. A British-German Comparison 1740-1945, Munich, 2010
 Royal Kinship. British and German Family Networks 1815-1914, Munich, 2008
 European Aristocracies and the Radical Right in the Interwar Period, Oxford University Press, 2007
 with Franz Bosbach and Keith Robbins (eds.), Birth or Talent ? The Formation of Elites in a British-German Comparison, Munich, 2003

Fiction 
 Cambridge 5, Limes/Random House 2017

External links 

 Home page at IAS
 Home page at the Institute of Historical Research, University of London

References 

21st-century German historians
Year of birth missing (living people)
Living people
German people of Austrian-Jewish descent